Arellanes is a surname. Notable people with the surname include:

Frank Arellanes (1882–1918), American baseball player
Gloria Arellanes (born 1946), American activist
Jim Arellanes (born 1974), American football player